Declercq is a Dutch occupational surname, meaning "the clerk", common in the Belgian province of West Flanders. It is a concatenation of the even more common name De Clercq that is quite specific to East Flanders. People with this name include:

 Andrew DeClercq (born 1973), American basketball player and coach
 Benjamin Declercq (born 1994), Belgian racing cyclist
 Gilbert Declercq (born 1946), Belgian painter, illustrator, and comics artist
 Nico F. Declercq (born 1975), Belgian physicist and mechanical engineer.
 Pierre Declercq (born 1938–1981), French New Caledonian politician, noted supporter of New Caledonian independence
 René Desiderius Declercq (1877–1932), Flemish-Dutch political activist, writer, poet, and composer
 Staf Declercq (1884–1942), Flemish nationalist Nazi collaborator and co-founder of the Vlaamsch Nationaal Verbond
 Tim Declercq (born 1989), Belgian racing cyclist
Declerck
 André Declerck (1919–1967), Belgian racing cyclist
 Richard Declerck (1899–1986), Belgian lawyer and politician

See also 
 2852 Declercq, Main Belt asteroid, named after the maiden name of the Belgian discoverer (Henri Debehogne)'s wife
 De Clercq
 Leclercq (surname)
 Leclerc (surname)
 Clerc (surname)
 De Clerc (surname)

References 

Dutch-language surnames
Surnames of Belgian origin
Occupational surnames